NBC 36 may refer to one of the following television stations in the United States:

Current
 KMIR-TV in Palm Springs, California
 KXAN-TV in Austin, Texas
 WCNC-TV in Charlotte, North Carolina

Former
KTVU (Stockton, California) (1954 to 1955)